Ralph Kern (born 24 February 1967) is a retired German gymnast. He competed at the 1988 Summer Olympics in all artistic gymnastics events and finished in 12th place with the West German team. His best individual result was 33rd place in the vault.

References

1967 births
Living people
German male artistic gymnasts
Gymnasts at the 1988 Summer Olympics
Olympic gymnasts of West Germany
Sportspeople from Stuttgart (region)
People from Heilbronn (district)